This is a listing of the horses that finished in either first, second, or third place and the number of starters in the Anne Arundel Stakes, an American stakes race for fillies three years-old at 1 mile (8 furlongs) on the turf held at Laurel Park Racecourse in Laurel, Maryland.  (List 1974-present)

A # designates that the race was run in two divisions in 1986.

References

External links
 Laurel Park website

Laurel Park Racecourse
Lists of horse racing results